Notable scientists of biogerontology include the following.

From Australia
 David Sinclair

From India
 Suresh Rattan

From  Romania
 Ana Aslan, Romanian biologist and physician who discovered the anti-aging effects of procaine

From the United Kingdom
 Aubrey de Grey
 João Pedro de Magalhães
 Robin Holliday
 Tom Kirkwood

From the United States
 Steven N. Austad
 Nir Barzilai
 Rochelle Buffenstein
 Judith Campisi
 Preston Estep
 Leonard P. Guarente
 Denham Harman
 Leonard Hayflick
 Matt Kaeberlein
 Cynthia Kenyon
 Valter Longo
 S. Jay Olshansky
 David Sinclair
 Jan Vijg

References

 
Lists of biologists by field
Medical lists
Lists by occupation